Jang Hyuk-jin (Korean: 장혁진, born Jang Seok-hyeon on 16 August 1971) is a South Korean actor. He graduated from Seoul Institute of the Arts – Department of Theater. He is better known for Dr. Romantic (2016), Suspicious Partner (2017), and playing the role of Bae Do-il in 2019 drama series VIP. He also appeared in 2019 TV series Vagabond, sequel of  Dr. Romantic 2 and 18 Again (2020). He has appeared in about 70 TV series and films including 2016 film Train to Busan. In 2021, he appeared in Taxi Driver and Now, We Are Breaking Up.

Filmography

Films

Television series

Awards and nominations

References

External links
 
 
 Jang Hyuk-jin on KMDb
 Jang Hyuk-jin on Daum 

21st-century South Korean male actors
South Korean male television actors
South Korean male film actors 
Living people
1971 births
Seoul Institute of the Arts alumni